Phang Nga is a town (thesaban mueang) in southern Thailand, capital of Phang Nga Province. The town covers the whole tambon Thai Chang of Mueang Phang Nga district. As of 2005 it had a population of 9,559 and covered an area of 6.75 km². Phang Nga is 764 km from Bangkok by road.

The municipal administration was created on 11 February 1937. The town is subdivided into nine wards (chumchon).
Talat Yai (ตลาดใหญ่)
Borirak Bamrung (บริรักษ์บำรุง)
Samakkhi (สามัคคี)
Thung Chedi (ทุ่งเจดีย์)
Ruamchai Phatthana (ร่วมใจพัฒนา)
Na Krok Khok Ya (นากรอกคอกหญ้า)
Thanon Mai (ถนนใหม่)
Khao Chang (เขาช้าง)
Wang Mokaeng (วังหม้อแกง)

Notable people
 
 
Teerayoot Suebsil (born 1978), professional footballer

References

External links

http://www.phangngacity.go.th (Thai)

Populated places in Phang Nga province
Populated places established in 1937
1937 establishments in Siam
Cities and towns in Thailand